Lynn Stein is a Scottish international bowls player.

Bowls career
In 207, she won three medals at the European Bowls Championships in Cyprus and two years later won two more medals including a gold at the same Championships.

She won a gold medal in the women's fours event (with Margaret Letham, Caroline Brown and Michelle Cooper ) at the 2012 World Outdoor Bowls Championship. One year later in 2013, she won her 6th and 7th medals at the European Bowls Championships in Spain.

Stein became a British champion after winning the 2019 triples title, at the British Isles Bowls Championships. This followed on from her triples success at the Scottish National Bowls Championships the previous year for Leven BC.

References

Scottish female bowls players
Living people
1968 births
Bowls World Champions
Bowls European Champions